Ton-Taun was an American indie rock band from Lancaster, Pennsylvania. Since 2007, they have released four albums.

History 
The band, whose founding members Jordan Capizzi and Doug Hynes met while attending high school in Lancaster, Pennsylvania was formed in 2007. Their debut album Circus Court was released in 2009. Their sophomore album Exporter was released in 2010. Their third album, titled Get Well was released in 2012 and was met with critical praise. This was followed by several lineup changes. In August 2015 Ton-Taun released their fourth album, a double LP titled "You're Not Doing It Right". A series of music videos preceded the release of the album. "You're Not Doing It Right" was made available on August 22, 2015 on iTunes, CD and limited edition colored vinyl and was lauded for its ambition. They have shared the stage with Future Islands, Why?, Clap Your Hands Say Yeah, Ra Ra Riot, Rubblebucket, Lavender Diamond, Kopecky and Built To Spill.

Current members 
 Jordan Capizzi-Vocals, Keys, Guitar
 Doug Hynes-Guitar
 Aaron Binder-Guitar, Keys
 Brian Trump-Drums
 Rob Nye-Bass
 John Spurlock-Keys, Guitar
 Kate Seifarth-Percussion, Vocals

Former members
 Mario Borgatta
 Louis Borgatta
 Josh Wood
 Alex Ocko

Discography 
 Circus Court (2009)
 Exporter (2010)
 Get Well (2012)
 You're Not Doing It Right (2015)

References

Indie rock musical groups from Pennsylvania
Musical groups established in 2007